Fovargue is a surname of British, Irish and French origin.

List of people with the surname 

 Vincent Fovargue (1900–1921), British-Irish war figure
 Walter Fovargue (1882–1963), American professional golfer, club maker, and golf course architect
 Yvonne Fovargue (born 1956), British politician, currently a Member of Parliament

References

See also 
 Fauvergue
 Forgues
 Favarger

French-language surnames
Surnames of Irish origin
Surnames of French origin
Surnames of British Isles origin